This is a complete list of estrogens and formulations that are approved by the  and available in the United States. Estrogens are used as hormonal contraceptives, in hormone replacement therapy, and in the treatment of gynecological disorders.

Estrogen-only

Oral/sublingual pills
 Conjugated estrogens (Premarin) – 0.3 mg, 0.45 mg, 0.625 mg, 0.9 mg, 1.25 mg, 2.5 mg
 Esterified estrogens (Amnestrogen, Estratab, Evex, Femogen, Menest) – 0.3 mg, 0.625 mg, 1.25 mg, 2.5 mg
 Estradiol (Estradiol, Gynodiol, Innofem) – 0.5 mg, 1 mg, 2 mg
 Estradiol acetate (Femtrace) – 0.45 mg, 0.9 mg, 1.8 mg
 Estropipate (Estropipate, Ogen .625, Ogen 1.25, Ogen 2.5, Ogen 5, Ortho-Est) – 0.75 mg, 1.5 mg, 3 mg, 6 mg
 Synthetic conjugated estrogens (Cenestin, Enjuvia) – 0.3 mg, 0.45 mg, 0.625 mg, 0.9 mg, 1.25 mg

Atypical (dual estrogen and nitrogen mustard alkylating antineoplastic):

 Estramustine phosphate sodium (Emcyt) – 140 mg

Oral estradiol valerate (except in combination with dienogest as an oral contraceptive) is not available in the U.S. and is used primarily in Europe.

Transdermal forms

Patches
 Estradiol (Alora, Climara, Esclim, Estraderm, Estradiol, Fempatch, Menostar, Minivelle, Vivelle, Vivelle-Dot) – 14 μg/24 hours, 25 μg/24 hours, 37.5 μg/24 hours, 50 μg/24 hours, 60 μg/24 hours, 75 μg/24 hours, 100 μg/24 hours

Gels
 Estradiol (Divigel, Elestrin, Estrogel) – 0.06% (0.87 g/activation, 1.25 g/activation), 0.1% (0.25 g/packet, 0.5 g/packet, 1 g/packet)

Sprays
 Estradiol (Evamist) – 1.53 mg/spray

Emulsions
 Estradiol hemihydrate (Estrasorb) – 0.25%

Vaginal forms

Tablets
 Estradiol (Estradiol, Vagifem) – 10 μg (25 μg discontinued)

Creams
 Conjugated estrogens (Premarin) – 0.625 mg/g (0.0625%)
 Estradiol (Estrace) – 0.01%
 Synthetic conjugated estrogens (Synthetic Conjugated Estrogens A) – 0.625 mg/g (0.0625%)

Inserts
 Estradiol (Imvexxy) – 4 μg, 10 μg

Rings
 Estradiol (Estring) – 7.5 μg/24 hours 
 Estradiol acetate (Femring) – 50 μg/24 hours, 100 μg/24 hours

Intramuscular injection
 Conjugated estrogens (Premarin) – 25 mg/vial
 Estradiol cypionate (Depo-Estradiol, Estradiol Cypionate) – 5 mg/mL (1 mg/mL and 3 mg/mL discontinued)
 Estradiol valerate (Delestrogen, Estradiol Valerate) – 10 mg/mL, 20 mg/mL, 40 mg/mL

Polyestradiol phosphate (Estradurin) was previously available in the U.S. but was discontinued.

Combined with progestins

For contraception
⇾ See here instead.

For menopausal symptoms

Oral pills
 Conjugated estrogens and medroxyprogesterone acetate (Premphase (Premarin, Cycrin 14/14), Premphase 14/14, Prempro, Prempro (Premarin, Cycrin), Prempro/Premphase) – 0.3 mg / 1.5 mg; 0.45 mg / 1.5 mg; 0.625 mg / 2.5 mg; 0.625 mg / 5 mg
 Estradiol and drospirenone (Angeliq) – 0.5 mg / 0.25 mg; 1 mg / 0.5 mg
 Estradiol and norethisterone acetate (Activella, Amabelz) – 1 mg / 0.5 mg; 0.5 mg / 0.1 mg
 Ethinylestradiol and norethisterone acetate (FemHRT) – 25 μg / 0.5 mg
 Estradiol and progesterone (Bijuva) – 0.5 mg / 100 mg; 1 mg / 100 mg

Transdermal patches
 Estradiol and levonorgestrel (Climara Pro) – 45 μg/24 hours / 15 μg/24 hours
 Estradiol and norethisterone acetate (Combipatch) – 50 μg/24 hours / 0.14 mg/24 hours; 50 μg/24 hours / 0.25 mg/24 hours

Combined with other medications

Oral pills
 Conjugated estrogens and bazedoxifene acetate (Duavee) – 20 mg / 0.45 mg

See also
 List of sex-hormonal medications available in the United States
 List of estrogens
 List of estrogen esters
 Oral contraceptive formulations
 Estradiol-containing oral contraceptive

Notes

References

External links
 For Women: Menopause—Medicines to Help You – U.S. Food and Drug Administration

Estrogens
Hormonal contraception